Avery is a census-designated place (CDP) in Calaveras County, California, United States. The population was 646 at the 2010 census, down from 672 at the 2000 census. Avery is located on State Route 4 and is home to the oldest continually operating hotel in the county, the Avery Hotel Restaurant & Saloon. Built in 1853, it was known as the "Half Way House," being located between Murphys, Arnold, and Calaveras Big Trees State Park.

Geography

History
The place is named after George J. Avery, its first postmaster. The first post office was established in 1885, closed in 1943, and re-established in 1949.

Demographics

At the 2010 census Avery had a population of 646. The racial makeup of Avery was 604 (93.5%) White, 5 (0.8%) African American, 7 (1.1%) Native American, 3 (0.5%) Asian, 1 (0.2%) Pacific Islander, 2 (0.3%) from other races, and 24 (3.7%) from two or more races. Hispanic or Latino of any race were 38 people (5.9%).

The whole population lived in households, no one lived in non-institutionalized group quarters and no one was institutionalized.

There were 281 households, 68 (24.2%) had children under the age of 18 living in them, 149 (53.0%) were opposite-sex married couples living together, 22 (7.8%) had a female householder with no husband present, 7 (2.5%) had a male householder with no wife present.  There were 20 (7.1%) unmarried opposite-sex partnerships, and 2 (0.7%) same-sex married couples or partnerships. 80 households (28.5%) were one person and 30 (10.7%) had someone living alone who was 65 or older. The average household size was 2.30.  There were 178 families (63.3% of households); the average family size was 2.80.

The age distribution was 129 people (20.0%) under the age of 18, 40 people (6.2%) aged 18 to 24, 126 people (19.5%) aged 25 to 44, 210 people (32.5%) aged 45 to 64, and 141 people (21.8%) who were 65 or older.  The median age was 48.1 years. For every 100 females, there were 105.7 males.  For every 100 females age 18 and over, there were 102.0 males.

There were 388 housing units at an average density of ,of which 281 were occupied, 218 (77.6%) by the owners and 63 (22.4%) by renters.  The homeowner vacancy rate was 7.6%; the rental vacancy rate was 11.3%.  495 people (76.6% of the population) lived in owner-occupied housing units and 151 people (23.4%) lived in rental housing units.

Politics 

References

External links

Census-designated places in Calaveras County, California
Census-designated places in California